Jimmy George (8 March 1955  – 30 November 1987) was an Indian volleyball player and captain of the India national volleyball team. Often dubbed the God of Indian volleyball, he is considered as one of the greatest volleyball players of all time. 

Jimmy played for Kerala and India as an amateur and later became the first Indian to become professional volleyball player. He played for professional clubs outside the country, most notably in Italy. At the age of 32, Jimmy died in a road accident in Italy on 30 November 1987, while playing for the Eurosibo Eurostyle, a first division club in the Italian professional league. He still remains as the youngest volleyball player to receive Arjuna Award, one of India's highest national sporting awards.

Career
Jimmy George was born to the Kudakkachira family, at Thundiyil near Peravoor in Kannur district, as the second son of George Joseph and Mary George. He learned to play volleyball from his father, a former university-level player. Jimmy played for St. Joseph's High School in Peravoor. In 1970, Jimmy became a member of the University of Calicut volleyball team. In 1973, he joined St. Thomas College, Pala. Jimmy represented the Kerala University four times from 1973 to 1976. The Kerala team won the All India Inter-University Championship during these four years. He became the captain of the team in 1973 and later secured a berth in the Kerala State Team at the age of 16, in 1971. Jimmy represented the Kerala state nine times.

In 1976, Jimmy was in his first year of medical college before joining the Kerala Police where he remained a member of the Kerala police team until his death. He took leave from the Kerala Police in 1979 and went to the Persian Gulf to play for Abu Dhabi Sports Club. In 1982, he left Abu Dhabi to join Coletto Club at Treviso in Italy and played for them for a season. He then switched to System Impiani and played for them in 1983-84. He returned to India and rejoined Kerala Police where played his last Nationals at Kanpur in 1985. Jimmy went back to Italy to play for Arrital team. In 1987-88 he signed a contract with Eurostyle-Euroslba at Montchiari in Brescia. During this period he died in a car crash.

Jimmy played for India's national volleyball team in the Asian Games in Tehran (1974), Bangkok (1978) and in Seoul (1986) where India won the bronze medal. He was captain of the Indian team that played at Saudi Arabia in 1985, and led the Indian team to victory in India Gold Cup International Volleyball Tournament at Hyderabad in 1986.

Awards and honours 
At age 21, Jimmy George was the youngest volleyball player to win the Arjuna Award. He was given the G.V. Raja Award in 1975 and won the Manorama Award, for the best sportsman of Kerala, in 1976. He was judged the best player in the Persian Gulf region while playing for Abu Dhabi Sports Club, from 1979-82. He played as a professional in Italy from 1982-1984 and 1985-1987, and in his prime was considered one of the best attackers of the world. In 2000, Malayala Manorama, a newspaper in Malayalam, honored him as the best sportsman of Kerala of the 20th century.

Death and legacy

Jimmy died in a car accident in Italy on 30 November 1987, at the age of 32. His funeral ceremony was attended by thousands of people from different parts of  Kannur District and Kerala State. He was cremated at the cemetery of St. Joseph's Church Peravoor. Following his death, the Jimmy George Foundation was established, which in 1989 instituted the Jimmy George Award for best sportsperson of Kerala. The foundation also makes available cash awards at St. Joseph's High School, Peravoor, and at Devagiri College.

The government of Kerala dedicated its indoor stadium at Trivandrum named as Jimmy George Indoor Stadium. At St. Thomas College, Pala, a volleyball stadium is named after him, as were a stadium of St.Joseph's Higher Secondary School and a road at Peravoor. At Kannur, the District Headquarters, Police Department named its conference hall in the name of Jimmy George. An indoor stadium in Italy, called PalaGeorge, was dedicated in his memory at Montichiari, Brescia, and an annual junior tournament is organized in his memory. Since 1989, the Kerala Volleyball League of North America organizes the Jimmy George Super Trophy Volleyball Tournament.

References

External links
A Collection of Jimmy's Videos on YouTube
A news article in The Hindu on Jimmy George

Indian men's volleyball players
Malayali people
People from Kannur district
Recipients of the Arjuna Award
1955 births
1987 deaths
Volleyball players from Kerala
Asian Games medalists in volleyball
Volleyball players at the 1974 Asian Games
Volleyball players at the 1978 Asian Games
Volleyball players at the 1986 Asian Games
Asian Games bronze medalists for India
Medalists at the 1986 Asian Games